The Accused is a 1960 Argentine crime drama directed and written by Antonio Cunill Jr. The film was based on a screen play by Marco Denevi.  The film starred Mario Soffici and Silvia Legrand.

Plot
Based on a real-life case in 1925, two great lawyers argue the case for and against a science teacher accused of the crime of teaching evolution.

Cast
Mario Soffici
Silvia Legrand
Guillermo Battaglia
Alita Román
Julián Bourges
Juan Carlos Galván
Trissi Bauer
Virginia Romay
Mario Danesi
Osvaldo Terranova
Héctor Gance
Enrique Kossi
José María Fra
Roberto Bordoni

Release
The film was released on 10 March 1960.

External links
 

1960 films
Films about lawyers
1960s Spanish-language films
1960 crime drama films
Argentine crime drama films
1960s Argentine films